Pepermölenbek is a small river of Hamburg, Germany. It flows into the Elbe in Hamburg-St. Pauli.

See also
List of rivers of Hamburg

Rivers of Hamburg
Rivers of Germany